The 1930 Southern League was the second season of speedway in the United Kingdom for Southern British teams. The Northern teams also had their second season known as the 1930 Speedway Northern League.

Summary
White City had left the league but 3 new teams - High Beech, Leicester Stadium and Nottingham  - joined. The Wembley Lions won their first title. Birmingham Brummies (Perry Barr) withdrew after 4 meetings and their record was expunged

Final table

Withdrawal (Record expunged) : Birmingham (Perry Barr)

Top Five Riders

See also
 List of United Kingdom Speedway League Champions

References

Speedway Southern League
1930 in British motorsport
1930 in speedway